The 25th Trampoline World Championships were held in Quebec, Canada from 31 October to 3 November 2007.

Results

Men

Trampoline Individual

Trampoline Team

Trampoline Synchro

Double Mini Trampoline

Double Mini Trampoline Team

Tumbling

Tumbling Team

Women

Trampoline Individual

Trampoline Team

Trampoline Synchro

Double Mini Trampoline

Double Mini Trampoline Team

Tumbling

Tumbling Team

Medal table

References
 Gymmedia

Trampoline World Championships
Trampoline Gymnastics World Championships
International gymnastics competitions hosted by Canada
2007 in Canadian sports